Elections were held in the state of Western Australia on 23 February 1980 to elect all 55 members to the Legislative Assembly and 16 members to the 32-seat Legislative Council. The Liberal-National Country coalition government, led by Premier Sir Charles Court, won a third term in office against the Labor Party, led by Opposition Leader Ron Davies.

The election produced very little in terms of the balance of the parties in Parliament—Labor won Kimberley from the Liberals in the Assembly, and a North Province seat in the Council, but lost two Council seats to the Liberals—one each in North Metropolitan and South-East Metropolitan. However, Labor received a substantial swing overall, increasing majorities in seats it already held, and reducing Liberal majorities in western suburban seats and pushing the key seats of Bunbury and Pilbara into marginal status. Despite a vigorous campaign against each other, the National Country and National parties, which had split in August 1978, failed to gain any seats off each other, each retaining three seats in the Assembly, and the former retaining one in the Council.

Results

Legislative Assembly

|}

Notes:
 714,724 electors were enrolled to vote at the election, but two seats were uncontested: the seat of Collie, held by Labor's Tom Jones and representing 8,854 electors, and East Melville, won by the Liberals' Anthony Trethowan representing 16,804 electors, which was uncontested due to the Labor candidate's failure to submit their nomination on time.
 The National Country Party contested seven seats in the 1977 election, winning six of them and attaining 5.28% of the vote. The National Party split from the National Country Party on 10 August 1978, with the former contesting 8 seats and the latter 11.

Legislative Council

|}

Notes:
 The National Country Party contested four seats in the 1977 election, winning three of them and attaining 5.56% of the vote. The National Party split from the National Country Party on 10 August 1978, with the former contesting 5 seats and the latter 4.

Seats changing hands

Post-election pendulum

See also
 Members of the Western Australian Legislative Assembly, 1977–1980
 Members of the Western Australian Legislative Assembly, 1980–1983
 Candidates of the 1980 Western Australian state election

References

Elections in Western Australia
1980 elections in Australia
1980s in Western Australia
February 1980 events in Australia